Thomas George Heath (August 3, 1913 – February 26, 1967) was an American catcher and scout in Major League Baseball and a manager in minor league baseball. He played in parts of three seasons in the majors between 1935 and 1938, all for the St. Louis Browns. He was a United States Army veteran of World War II.

He appeared in 134 total MLB games for the Browns, compiling a batting average of .230 in 330 at bats with 76 hits (including three home runs) and 34 runs batted in. 

Heath was somewhat better known for his 18-year career as a minor league manager (1947–64), where he principally worked in the New York Giants and Los Angeles Angels farm systems, and in between piloted four Pacific Coast League clubs between 1952 and 1961. As the leader of the Giants' Minneapolis Millers Triple-A affiliate (1949–51), he managed future major leaguers such as Willie Mays and Hoyt Wilhelm — both members of the Baseball Hall of Fame. In 1948, he managed the Trenton Giants to the Interstate League championship, the only title he won during his managerial career.

Heath served as a scout for the Angels after his managing career ended. He died at age 53 in Los Gatos, California.

References

External links

1913 births
1967 deaths
Baseball coaches from Colorado
Baseball players from Colorado
California Angels scouts
Columbus Red Birds players
Hawaii Islanders managers
Los Angeles Angels scouts
Major League Baseball catchers
Milwaukee Brewers (minor league) players
Minneapolis Millers (baseball) managers
Minor league baseball managers
New York Giants (NL) scouts
People from Ventura, California
People from Washington County, Colorado
Portland Beavers managers
Rock Island Islanders players
Sacramento Solons managers
St. Louis Browns players
San Antonio Missions players
San Francisco Seals (baseball) managers
Syracuse Chiefs players
Toronto Maple Leafs (International League) players
United States Army personnel of World War II